A rubric is a word or section of text that is traditionally written or printed in red ink for emphasis. In these, red letters were used to highlight initial capitals (particularly of psalms), section headings and names of religious significance, a practice known as rubrication, which was a separate stage in the production of a manuscript.

Rubric can also mean the red ink or paint used to make rubrics, or the pigment used to make it. Although red was most often used, other colours came into use from the late Middle Ages onwards, and the word rubric was used for these also. Medievalists can use patterns of rubrication to help identify textual traditions.

Various figurative senses of the word have been extended from its original meaning. Usually these senses are used within the set phrase "under [whatever] rubric", for example, "under this rubric, [X is true]", or "[X was done] under the rubric of Y". Such senses include: "an authoritative rule"; "the title of a statute"; "something under which a thing is classed"; "an explanatory or introductory commentary"; "an established rule, tradition, or custom"; or "a guide listing specific criteria for grading or scoring academic assignments".

As liturgical instructions
Instructions for a priest explaining what he must do during a liturgy were also rubricated in missals and the other liturgical books, and the texts to be spoken aloud were in black. From this, "rubric" has a secondary denotation of an instruction in a text, regardless of how it is actually inscribed. This is the oldest recorded definition in English, found in 1375. Less formally, "rubrics" may refer to any liturgical action customarily performed, whether or not pursuant to a written instruction. The history, status, and authority of the content of rubrics are significant, and sometimes controversial, among liturgical scholars. In the past, some theologians distinguished between rubrics they considered of Divine origin and those merely of human origin. Rubrics were probably originally verbal, and then written in separate volumes. The earliest extant liturgical books do not contain them, but from references in texts of the first millennium it appears that written versions existed. Full rubrics regarding matters such as vesture, appearance of the altar, timing of specific liturgies, and similar matters still may be published separately. In modern liturgical books, e. g. the Catholic Roman Missal, lengthy general rubrics, probably printed in black, pertain to such matters and preface the actual order of liturgies, which contain shorter, specific rubrics that still are usually rubricated. Red is also often used to distinguish words spoken by the celebrant and those by the congregation, or by other specific persons involved in the liturgy, e. g. those marrying.

After the development of printing

With the arrival of printing, other typographic effects such as italic type, bolded type, or different sizes of type were used to emphasize a section of text, and as printing in two colours is more expensive and time consuming, rubrication has tended to be reserved for sacred and liturgical books or luxury editions of other works.

William Morris's medievally inspired typography for the Kelmscott Press at the end of the 19th century included chapter titles and other accents in red, or rarely blue, ink, and was influential on small press art typography associated with the Arts and Crafts movement in both England and the United States, particularly the work of the Ashendene, Doves, and Roycroft Presses.

Around 1900, rubrication was incorporated into a Red letter edition of the King James Version of the Bible to distinguish the Dominical words, i. e., those spoken by Jesus Christ during His corporeal life on Earth, because that translation lacked quotation marks. Other versions of the Bible have since adopted the popular practice.

Rubrics in education 

A rubric is an explicit set of criteria used for assessing a particular type of work or performance and provides more details than a single grade or mark. Rubrics, therefore, help teachers grade more objectively and "they improve students' ability to include required elements of an assignment".

See also
Code of Rubrics
Rubrication
Scriptorium

References

Glossary of Manuscript Terms British Library

External links

Rubrics of the Anglican Low Mass (from 1931) Very full set of rubrics (more than a normal service book would include); perversely, the words to be spoken are here shown in red, and the rubrics in black.
Catholic Order of Mass Rubrics showing who speaks are in red; others in small italics.
Kelmscott Press Examples of Kelmscott Press pages showing use of red accents.
So this then is the preachment entitled Chicago tongue A "flip book" presentation of the Roycroft Press edition c. 1913, illustrating use of rubrics in the Arts and Crafts tradition.
Good Recipes This cookbook  published by the Woman's Society of the Winnetka Congregational Church in 1906 shows the influence of Arts and Crafts rubrics on everyday typography in the early 20th century.

Typography
Manuscripts
Christian practices
Catholic liturgy